Andrei Yakovlevich Levanidov (174726 February 1802) was a Russian soldier and administrator.

References

Sources

1747 births
1802 deaths
Russian lieutenant generals